Uncle Tom's Cabaña is a 1947 American animated short film directed by Tex Avery. The short is a parody of Harriet Beecher Stowe's 1852 novel Uncle Tom's Cabin, and is Avery's second parody of the novel, the first being Uncle Tom's Bungalow in 1937 while at Warner Bros. Cartoons.

The cartoon was well-received by the film press in 1947, but was fiercely criticized by an African-American weekly newspaper on its re-release in 1954, which, seven years after the cartoon's first release, accused the film of inflaming racial misunderstanding. The short was later banned from television airings.

Premise
Uncle Tom tells the blood-curdling story of how the evil Simon Legree tried to foreclose on Tom's simple log cabin. Also features Red from Red Hot Riding Hood as Little Eva.

Reception
In 1954, the African-American weekly Pittsburgh Courier published an editorial titled "Uncle Tom's Cabana Outrages Negro Audiences: What Price Brotherhood If Movies Play Up Handkerchief Heads?" The editorial called the cartoon "a base stereotype and an insult to Negroes", saying, "Even though there has been a general loosening of the Production Code in order to hype the box office, there is no reason why Negroes should continue to be ridiculed and jeered at in motion pictures. This medium reaches all levels of mentalities and feeds the flames of prejudice by projecting such canards as Uncle Tom's Cabana... Showing this insult during Brotherhood Week was a kick in the teeth to a fine effort to wipe out prejudice in America. With the world in ferment, Uncle Tom's Cabana set the movies back ten years."

However, the film press had no such objections in 1947. The Film Daily said, "A modern version of the old tale, it is a real seller." Motion Picture Herald described it as "a modern version with the emphasis on swing," and Motion Picture Exhibitor said, "This will appeal, especially to kids."

Uncle Tom's Cabaña, along with Half-Pint Pygmy, were banned from television airings in the United States due to ethnic stereotyping of African-Americans. Despite the controversy, this short and Half-Pint Pygmy were released on The Compleat Tex Avery laserdisc in the 1990s.

Availability 
The short was included on the 1993 laserdisc compilation The Compleat Tex Avery.

See also 
 Uncle Tom's Bungalow, a 1937 Warner Bros. short also directed by Tex Avery
 Mickey's Mellerdrammer, 1933 Disney animated short

References

External links 
 
 

1947 films
1947 animated films
1947 short films
1940s parody films
1947 comedy films
1940s American animated films
1940s animated short films
African-American animated films
Metro-Goldwyn-Mayer animated short films
Films directed by Tex Avery
Films based on works by Harriet Beecher Stowe
Films based on American novels
Films scored by Scott Bradley
Uncle Tom's Cabin
Films with screenplays by Henry Wilson Allen
Films produced by Fred Quimby
Metro-Goldwyn-Mayer cartoon studio short films
Red (animated character) films
Film controversies
African-American-related controversies in film
Race-related controversies in animation
Race-related controversies in film
Ethnic humour